This is an incomplete list of Statutory Instruments of the United Kingdom in 1971.

 Act of Sederunt (Legal Aid Rules Amendment) 1971 S.I. 1971/174 
 Legal Aid (Scotland) (General) Amendment Regulations 1971 S.I. 1971/194
 Lands Tribunal for Scotland Rules 1971 S.I. 1971/218
 Act of Sederunt (Legal Aid Fees) 1971 S.I. 1971/219
 Police Pensions Regulations 1971 S.I. 1971/232
 County Court Funds (Amendment) Rules 1971 S.I. 1971/260
 Act of Sederunt (Legal Aid) (Children) 1971 S.I. 1971/287
 Legal Aid (Scotland) (Children) Regulations 1971 S.I. 1971/288
 Legal Aid (Scotland) (Extension of Proceedings) Regulations 1971 S.I. 1971/317
 Great Ouse River Authority (Littleport and Downham Internal Drainage District) Order 1970 S.I. 1971/404
 Legal Aid (Scotland) (Children) Amendment Regulations 1971 S.I. 1971/554
 Police Pensions (Amendment) Regulations 1971 S.I. 1971/583
 Holyrood Park Regulations 1971 S.I. 1971/593
 Double Taxation Relief (Taxes on Income) (France) Order 1971 S.I. 1971/718
 Act of Adjournal (Criminal Legal Aid Fees Amendment) 1971 S.I. 1971/926
 Mid Southern Water Order 1971 S.I. 1971/968
 Rent Assessment Committees (England and Wales) Regulations 1971 S.I. 1971/1065
 Crown Court Rules 1971 S.I. 1971/1292
 Police Pensions (Amendment) (No. 2) Regulations 1971 S.I. 1971/1327
 Indictment Rules 1971 S.I. 1971/1253
 Police Pensions (Amendment) (No. 3) Regulations 1971 S.I. 1971/1466
 "Zebra" Pedestrian Crossings Regulations 1971 S.I. 1971/1524
 The Building (Seventh Amendment) Regulations 1971 S.I. 1971/1600
 Wireless Telegraphy (Control of Interference from Radio Frequency Heating Apparatus) Regulations 1971 S.I. 1971/1675
 Temples Order 1971 S.I. 1971/1732
 Act of Sederunt (Legal Aid) (Children) (Amendment) 1971 S.I. 1971/1795
 Act of Sederunt (Legal Aid Rules and Legal Aid Fees Amendment) 1971 S.I. 1971/1796
 Friendly Societies (Fees) Order 1971 S.I. 1971/1900
 Legal Aid (Scotland) (Extension of Proceedings) (No. 2) Regulations 1971 S.I. 1971/1912
 Legal Aid (Scotland) (General) Amendment (No. 2) Regulations 1971 S.I. 1971/1914
 Extradition (Hijacking) Order 1971 S.I. 1971/2102
 Extradition (Tokyo Convention) Order 1971 S.I. 1971/2103

External links
Legislation.gov.uk delivered by the UK National Archive
UK SI's on legislation.gov.uk
UK Draft SI's on legislation.gov.uk

See also
List of Statutory Instruments of the United Kingdom

Lists of Statutory Instruments of the United Kingdom
Statutory Instruments